Lanece Clarke (born 4 November 1987) is a Bahamian sprinter. She competed in the 4 × 400 metres relay at the 2013 and 2015 World Championships and the 2016 Olympic Games without qualifying for the final. Clarke attended CR.Walker High School in Nassau, Bahamas and McKendree University where she was inducted into the Hall of fame in 2021.

International competitions

Personal bests
Outdoor
100 metres – 11.74 (+0.2 m/s, Edwardsville 2008)
200 metres – 23.41 (Nassau 2014)
400 metres – 52.43 (Nassau 2014)
Indoor
200 metres – 23.86 (Birmingham, AL 2014)
400 metres – 53.40 (Blacksburg 2014)

References

External links
Official site

1987 births
Living people
Bahamian female sprinters
World Athletics Championships athletes for the Bahamas
Athletes (track and field) at the 2015 Pan American Games
Sportspeople from Nassau, Bahamas
Olympic athletes of the Bahamas
Athletes (track and field) at the 2016 Summer Olympics
Athletes (track and field) at the 2014 Commonwealth Games
Commonwealth Games competitors for the Bahamas
Pan American Games competitors for the Bahamas
Olympic female sprinters